Bella Dramatic is an existential garage rock band from Humboldt County, California. The band consists of the Kitzerow brothers, Jason (vocals, guitar) and Joe (drums, percussion), plus a rotating assortment of musicians. As of 2007 they do not perform live shows, but focus on recording original material.

Since forming in 1998, Bella Dramatic has taken a lo-fidelity do-it-yourself approach to writing, producing, and distributing their songs independent from the traditional music industry. The brothers firmly believe that touring and playing clubs and pubs is not necessary, and often refer to themselves as "the Steely Dan of garage bands." Furthermore, the music they produce is available for free because they feel that artistic integrity excludes the exchange of money for music.

Bella Dramatic were featured on the KRFH radio program "Local Lixx" in 2005. In 2006 they wrote and recorded theme music for KSLG DJ Plastic Jackson.

External links
Humboldtmusic.com/BellaDramatic
Myspace.com/BellaDramatic

Garage rock groups from California
Musical groups established in 1998
1998 establishments in California